Magnus Gustafsson defeated Sergi Bruguera 6–4 6–2 to win the 1994 Dubai Tennis Championships singles event. Karel Nováček was the defending champion.

Seeds

Draws

Finals

Section 1

Section 2

External links
 ATP Singles draw

Singles